Stocksbridge High School is a mixed secondary school for 11 to 16-year-olds, in the town of Stocksbridge, South Yorkshire, England. In December 2017 the school gained Academy school status joining Minerva Learning Trust.

History
The first school established in Stocksbridge was a small single storey building constructed by a company of Independent Worshippers' on the site of the present NatWest bank in Stocksbridge. The school was named 'Ebeneezer' and was used as both a day school and a chapel. In 1927 Stocksbridge School was constructed on Shay House Lane and Ralph Ellis became the first headmaster. Between 1939 and 1945 the school played an active part in the war effort, and in March 1941 they raised a total of 91 pounds, 17 shillings and 8 pence as part of a 'War Weapons Week.' Two air raid shelters were also constructed, one on the site of the old car park and another on the site of the old sports hall. In 1971 the school became a comprehensive and was renamed to Stocksbridge High School.

Today
Stocksbridge High School consists of two blocks, north and south. The south block is a modern construction completed in 2014 and the north completely refurbished. At the same time of constructing a new block a sports hall was added to the site which also contains a dance studio.

The school serves the local communities of Stocksbridge and Deepcar, but also has a tradition of children attending from the High Green and Chapeltown areas of the city; a bus service supports the attendance of these out of catchment pupils'.

Academic performance
The school was inspected in May 2022 by Ofsted, which gave a rating of Grade II 'Good' in all areas. This followed a trend of improvement in all performance measures since 2017. Up until this point the school had been rated as "requires improvement" since 2014.

Curriculum 
The school follows the National Curriculum and offers the GCSE and vocational qualifications. The core subjects are English language and literature, mathematics and science, other subjects being art, music, sports, design and technology, and "other cultural pursuits" and civic responsibility.

Pastoral care 
The school has non-teaching employees who support pupils' wellbeing. There is support for pupils with specialist educational needs and disability (SEND), a school council, and pupil volunteers as anti-bullying ambassadors under the Diana Award.

Notable former pupils

 Oliver Sykes - Lead vocalist for Bring Me the Horizon
 Alex Turner - Lead vocalist and guitarist for Arctic Monkeys
 Matt Helders - Drummer and vocalist for Arctic Monkeys
 Nick O'Malley - Bassist and vocalist for Arctic Monkeys
 Jamie Cook - Guitarist for Arctic Monkeys
 Tracy Palmer - Professor and Fellow of the Royal Society at Newcastle University

References

External links 
 Stocksbridge High School official website

Secondary schools in Sheffield
Educational institutions established in 1927
1927 establishments in England
Academies in Sheffield